Robert Christian (December 27, 1939 – January 27, 1983) was an American actor.

Early life and education 
Christian was born in Los Angeles and began acting as a child, appearing on Amos 'n' Andy and The Andy Griffith Show. He later moved to New York and studied at the Actors Studio with Lee Strasberg.

Career 
Christian was a member of the Negro Ensemble Company and appeared in numerous stage productions, winning an Obie Award in 1976 for his performance in Athol Fugard's Blood Knot at the Manhattan Theater Club. Christian appeared as Detective Bob Morgan on Another World from January to December 1982.

Personal life 
Christian left Another World before he died of cancerous complications of AIDS in January 1983.

Filmography

Film

Television

References

External links
 
 
 
 

1939 births
1983 deaths
20th-century American male actors
American male stage actors
American male television actors
African-American male actors
Obie Award recipients
AIDS-related deaths in New York (state)
20th-century African-American people